Jean Collins Musonda Kalusambo is a member of the African Union's Economic, Social and Cultural Council representing Central Africa.

References

Democratic Republic of the Congo politicians
Economic, Social and Cultural Council Standing Committee members
Living people
Democratic Republic of the Congo diplomats
Year of birth missing (living people)
21st-century Democratic Republic of the Congo people